Junya Yamaguchi (Producer name Juny Mag)山口潤也 is a Japanese keyboard player, pianist, composer, arranger and music producer based in Los Angeles and New York.

Background

Junya Yamaguchi (producer name JUNY MAG) is a Japanese composer, producer, arranger and keyboardist based in Los Angeles. He started his life as a musician from age of ten. He won several YAMAHA Electone competitions with his own arrangement and composition in his teens. From 2004, he formed his own band called ULANORI, which released two albums in 2007 and 2008. Then he moved to New York City in the end of 2008. In NYC, Junya has worked with various musicians and producers. From 2011 Junya became main keyboardist of Andy Suzuki & The Method, played at Artpark 2014 opening for Ringo Starr (Beatles), with Andy Suzuki & The Method. In 2014, at the Metlife Stadium in NJ, he performed "America The Beautiful"with Queen Latifah. at the opening ceremony of Super Bowl 2014.

Junya moved to Los Angeles in 2014 then he started working as a music producer "Juny Mag". He has been working for Andy Suzuki and The Method, Brian Soko, Murder Beats, Rasool Diaz, Aluna George,  Unique Zayas, Omylrd and so on.

Discography

References

External links
 Junya Yamaguchi Official Website

Year of birth missing (living people)
Living people
Japanese keyboardists